The Diocese of Cape Town is a diocese of the Anglican Church of Southern Africa (ACSA) which presently covers central Cape Town, some of its suburbs and the island of Tristan da Cunha, though in the past it has covered a much larger territory. The Ordinary of the diocese is Archbishop of Cape Town and ex officio Primate and Metropolitan of the ACSA. His seat is St. George's Cathedral in Cape Town.

Desmond Tutu was archbishop from 1986 to 1996 and was archbishop-emeritus until his death in 2021. The current archbishop is Thabo Makgoba. Because of the archbishop's responsibilities as primate, many of his diocesan duties are delegated to a suffragan bishop known as the Bishop of Table Bay, an office currently held by Joshua Louw. (This is similar to the Bishop of Dover in the Church of England Diocese of Canterbury, who has held such a role since 1980.)

History 

The diocese came into being in 1847 with the consecration of the first bishop, Robert Gray, and was the first diocese of what was to become the Church of the Province of Southern Africa and subsequently the Anglican Church of Southern Africa. The original territory of the diocese, which had previously fallen under the Diocese of Calcutta, included the whole of Southern Africa.

In 1853, the territory was reduced by the creation of the Diocese of Grahamstown in the eastern parts of the Cape Colony and the Diocese of Natal in the Colony of Natal. In 1859, the Diocese of St Helena was created for Saint Helena and Ascension Island. In 1863, the Diocese of Bloemfontein was created, taking over all the territory north of the Orange River and the Drakensberg mountains. In 1866, J. Harries Thomas was archdeacon of Cape Town  and H. Badnall, archdeacon of George; and N. J. Merriman, archdeacon of Bloemfontein (by then separated) was still a canon of Cape Town cathedral. The territory of the Cape Town diocese was further reduced in 1911 by the creation of the dioceses of George and Kimberley and Kuruman. Finally, in 2005 the diocese was divided into three, with the part to north of the city of Cape Town becoming the Diocese of Saldanha Bay and the part to the east of the city becoming the Diocese of False Bay.

Parishes 

 Cathedral Archdeaconry
 Cathedral of St George the Martyr, Cape Town
 Archdeaconry of Athlone
 St Mark the Evangelist, Athlone
 St John, Crawford
 St Dominic, Hanover Park
 The Holy Nativity, Hazendal
 All Saints, Lansdowne
 St Aidan, Lansdowne
 St George the Martyr, Silvertown
 Archdeaconry of Constantia
 St Martin, Bergvliet
 Christ Church, Constantia
 St Luke, Diep River
 Christ Church, Kenilworth
 St Philip, Kenwyn
 Holy Spirit, Kirstenhof
 All Saints, Plumstead
 St Faith, Plumstead
 St Cyprian, Retreat
 St Andrew, Steenberg
 Emmanuel, Wynberg
 St John, Wynberg
 Archdeaconry of Groote Schuur
 St Mark, Cape Town
 St Philip, Cape Town
 St Michael and All Angels, Observatory
 St Luke, Salt River
 All Saints, Woodstock
 St Bartholomew, Woodstock
 St Mary the Virgin, Woodstock
 Archdeaconry of Ibongoletu
 Church of the Resurrection, Bonteheuwel
 Eluvukweni Mission, Crossroads
 St Columba, Guguletu
 St Mary Magdalene, Guguletu
 Church of the Holy Spirit, Heideveld
 St Cyprian, Langa
 Church of the Reconciliation, Manenberg
 Holy Cross, Nyanga
 Archdeaconry of Rondebosch
 Christ the King, Claremont
 St Matthew, Claremont
 St Saviour, Claremont
 St Peter, Mowbray
 St Andrew, Newlands
 St Paul, Rondebosch
 St Thomas, Rondebosch
 Archdeaconry of Waterfront
 St Peter, Camps Bay
 St Paul, Cape Town
 Church of the Ascension, Devil's Peak
 St Barnabas, Gardens
 St Peter the Fisherman, Hout Bay
 Church of the Holy Redeemer, Sea Point
 St James the Great, Sea Point
 St Mary, Tristan da Cunha

List of Bishops and Archbishops

Assistant bishops
From 1931, Sidney Lavis was coadjutor bishop of the diocese. In 1964, Patrick Barron became an assistant bishop of the diocese.

Schools 

The Diocese has four diocesan schools:

 Diocesan College
 Herschel Girls' School
 St. Cyprian's School
 St. George's Grammar School

Coat of arms

The diocese has borne arms since its inception.  The arms, designed by Bishop Gray, combined elements of those of the dioceses of Durham (where Gray had been Bishop) and Bristol (his first chaplaincy, when his father was Bishop of Bristol) and of Baroness Burdett-Coutts, who financed the establishment of the diocese.  

In their original form, the arms were : Quarterly  Azure  and  Sable:  I  and IV, a lion rampant Argent; II and IV, three open  crowns  palewise Or;  on  a  cross throughout Or an anchor in fess point Sable and in honour point the shield of arms of Baroness Burdett-Coutts; the shield ensigned with a Bishop's mitre proper.

The arms were revised by the College of Arms and granted in 1952.  The revision consisted of replacing the Burdett-Coutts shield with a stag's head  erased  Gules, between  the attires a pheon Azure.  These arms were registered at the Bureau of Heraldry in 1968.

References

External links 

Christianity in Cape Town
1847 establishments in the Cape Colony
Anglican Church of Southern Africa dioceses